Agata and the Storm is a 2004 Italian comedy film directed by Silvio Soldini.

Cast 
 Licia Maglietta - Agata Torregiani
 Giuseppe Battiston - Romeo D'Avanzo
 Emilio Solfrizzi - Gustavo Torregiani
 Marina Massironi - Ines Silvestri
 Claudio Santamaria - Nico
 Giselda Volodi - Maria Libera
 Ann Eleonora Jørgensen - Pernille Margarethe Kierkegaard
 Remo Remotti - Generoso Rambone
  - Daria

External links 

2004 films
2004 comedy films
Films directed by Silvio Soldini
Films set in Genoa
Italian comedy films
2000s Italian-language films